"Taka takata" is a song originally recorded by Paco Paco, a Spanish singer living in Málaga - Spain. The song was released as a single in 1972 and was a hit in Europe.

In the same year the song was adapted into French under the title "Taka takata (La femme du Toréro)" by Claude Lemesle and Richelle Dassin.

The French version was recorded by Joe Dassin. He released it in 1972 on his album Joe and as a single.

Background and writing 
The Paco Paco original was written by Al Verlane. The recording was produced by Biram.

Commercial performance 
The single "Taka takata" by Joe Dassin reached no. 1 in Finland (according to the chart, courtesy of Intro, that U.S. Billboard published in its "Hits of the World" section), at least no. 9 in Greece in the international singles chart (courtesy of Hellenikos Vorras and Epikera), and at least no. 4 in French Switzerland (chart courtesy of Radio Suisse Romande).

A version by Frederik reached at least the top 3 in Finland.

Track listings

Paco Paco (original) version 
7" single Bellaphon BL 18093
 "Taka takata" (2:29)
 "Olé España" (2:44)

Joe Dassin version 
7" single CBS S 8121 (Germany, etc.)
 "Taka takata (La femme du Toréro)" (2:41)
 "Le cheval de fer" (2:35)

Charts 
 "Taka takata" by Paco Paco

 "Taka takata (La femme du Toréro)" by Joe Dassin

References 

1972 songs
1972 singles
Joe Dassin songs
Bellaphon Records singles
CBS Disques singles
Song recordings produced by Jacques Plait
Songs written by Claude Lemesle